Zaprudka is a rural locality (a village) in Spasskoye Rural Settlement, Vologodsky District, Vologda Oblast, Russia. The population was 19 as of 2002.

Geography 
Zaprudka is located 29 km south of Vologda (the district's administrative centre) by road. Volkovo is the nearest rural locality.

References 

Rural localities in Vologodsky District